N'zeto is a town, with a population of 28,840 (2014 census), and a municipality located in the province of Zaire in Angola. During the Portuguese domain the town was called Ambrizete. The municipality has an estimated population of 56,199 (2019). It is served by N'zeto Airport.

References

Populated places in Zaire Province
Municipalities of Angola